Gram is a unit of mass.

Gram may also  refer to:

Mythology and fiction 
 Gram (mythology), a sword in Norse mythology
 Gram of Denmark, a legendary king
 Mount Gram (Middle-earth), a fictional place in Tolkien's writings
 The lance of Gallantmon in the Japanese anime television series Digimon Tamers

People 
 Gram (surname), a list of people
 Gram Parsons (1946–1973), American singer and musician
 Short for grandmother

Places 
 Gram, Denmark, a town
 Gram Municipality, a former municipality in Denmark
 Gram panchayat, a local government division in India

Plants 
 Gram, a type of chickpea
 Gram, an abbreviation of Grammatophyllum, an orchid genus

Science and technology 
 Gram, a Hewlett Packard subsidiary formed from their acquisition of Palm, Inc.
 GRAM, Generally Recognized as Mature, related to Open-source software/Free and open-source software
 GRAM, Graphic (GPL) Random Access Memory, used in the TI-99/4A
 Grand River Aseptic Manufacturing, sterile pharmaceutical contract manufacturer
 Grid Resource Allocation Manager, a component of the Globus Toolkit in grid computing
 Gram stain

Other uses 
 Grand Rapids Art Museum (GRAM), Michigan
 Gramin Agriculture Markets (GrAM), in India
 Slang term for Instagram, a social media photo-sharing service

See also 
 Vigna mungo, a bean also known as black gram
 Mung bean, also called green gram
 Macrotyloma uniflorum, a legume also known as horse gram and Madras gram
 Pigeon pea, also called red gram
 Vigna aconitifolia, also known as moth gram and Turkish gram
 Gramm (disambiguation)
 Grams (disambiguation)